Sharir is a surname. Notable people with the surname include:

Avraham Sharir (born 1932), Israeli politician
Limor Schreibman-Sharir, Israeli writer and politician, and 1973 Miss Israel
Micha Sharir (born 1950), Israeli mathematician and computer scientist

Hebrew-language surnames